AS Momekano is a football club in Bandundu, Democratic Republic of Congo.  They play in the Linafoot, the top level of professional football in DR Congo.

Achievements
Bandundu Provincial League: 1
 2007

Bandundu (city)
Football clubs in the Democratic Republic of the Congo